A hoverport is a terminal for hovercraft, having passenger facilities where needed and infrastructure to allow the hovercraft to come on land. Today, only a small number of civilian hoverports remain, due to the relatively high fuel consumption of hovercraft compared to traditional ferries. Military hoverports also exist however, for example in Haldia in India, from which the Indian Coast Guard operates three hovercraft.

References 

Ports and harbours
Ports